Natalie Lisinska (born 11 January 1982) is a British-Canadian actress.

Lisinska was born in Shrewsbury, Shropshire, England and grew up on Vancouver Island in British Columbia, attending St. Michaels University School. She studied drama at Ryerson University Theatre School.

Filmography

Film

Television

References

External links
 
 Natalie Lisinska at Edna Talent Management
 

1982 births
Living people
21st-century Canadian actresses
21st-century English actresses
Actors from Shrewsbury
Actors from Shropshire
Actresses from British Columbia
Canadian film actresses
Canadian people of Ukrainian descent
Canadian television actresses
English emigrants to Canada
English film actresses
English people of Ukrainian descent
English television actresses
People from Vancouver Island
Toronto Metropolitan University alumni
Canadian expatriates in England